Rock Preston (born March 26, 1975) is a former Canadian football running back in the Canadian Football League (CFL). He played for the Calgary Stampeders and Saskatchewan Roughriders. He played college football at Florida State.

His brother, Roell Preston, was a teammate on Saskatchewan and also played in the National Football League.

References

External links
Just Sports Stats
College stats
CFLapedia bio

1975 births
Living people
Players of American football from Miami
American football running backs
Canadian football running backs
Florida State Seminoles football players
Calgary Stampeders players
Saskatchewan Roughriders players
Players of Canadian football from Miami